Kevin Vaughan (born April 30, 1962) is an American real estate broker and politician from the state of Tennessee. A Republican, Vaughan has represented the 95th district of the Tennessee House of Representatives, based in Collierville in the suburbs of Memphis, since 2017.

Career
In February 2017, Mark Lovell resigned from the 95th district of the Tennessee House of Representatives due to allegations of inappropriate sexual conduct, and a special election was called to replace him. Vaughan narrowly won the seven-way April Republican primary with 27% of the vote to his nearest opponent's 26%; he went on to easily win the June general election over Democrat Julie Byrd Ashworth with 62% of the vote. Vaughan was overwhelmingly elected to his first full term in 2018 against Democrat Sanjeev Memula.

Personal life
Vaughan lives in Collierville with his wife, Johnna, with whom he has two children.

References

Living people
Republican Party members of the Tennessee House of Representatives
21st-century American politicians
1962 births
University of Memphis alumni
People from Collierville, Tennessee